Bruce Leroy may refer to:
Leroy Green, also known as Bruce Leroy, in 1985 film The Last Dragon, who is portrayed by Taimak
Alex Caceres, also known as Bruce Leroy, UFC fighter